Vineland is a 1990 novel by Thomas Pynchon, a postmodern fiction set in California, United States in 1984, the year of Ronald Reagan's reelection. Through flashbacks by its characters, who have lived the sixties in their youth, the story accounts for the free spirit of rebellion of that decade, and describes the traits of the "fascistic Nixonian repression" and its War on Drugs that clashed with it; and it articulates the slide and transformation that occurred in U.S. society from the 1960s to the 1980s.

Plot 

The story is set in California, United States, in 1984, the year of Ronald Reagan's reelection. After a scene in which former hippie Zoyd Wheeler dives through a window, something he is required to do yearly to keep receiving mental disability checks, the action of the novel opens with the resurfacing of federal agent Brock Vond, who (through a platoon of agents) forces Zoyd and his 14-year-old daughter Prairie out of their house. They hide from Brock, and from Hector Zuñiga (a drug-enforcement federale from Zoyd's past, who Zoyd suspects is in cahoots with Brock) with old friends of Zoyd's, who recount to the mystified Prairie the story of Brock's motivation for what he has done.

This hinges heavily on Frenesi Gates, Prairie's mother, whom she has never met. In the '60s, during the height of the hippie era, the fictive College of the Surf (located in equally fictive Trasero County, said to be located between Orange County and San Diego County in Southern California) seceded from the United States and became its own nation of hippies and dope smokers, called the People's Republic of Rock and Roll (PR³). Brock Vond, a federal prosecutor, intends to bring down PR³, and finds a willing accomplice in Frenesi. She is a member of 24fps, a militant film collective (other members of which are the people telling Prairie their story in the present), that seeks to document the "fascists'" transgressions against freedom and hippie ideals. Frenesi is uncontrollably attracted to Brock and the sex he provides, and ends up working as a double agent to bring about the killing of the de facto leader of PR³, Weed Atman (a mathematics professor who accidentally became the subject of a cult of personality).

Her betrayal caused Frenesi to flee, and she has been living in witness protection with Brock's help up until the present day. Now she has disappeared. The membership of 24fps, Brock Vond, and Hector Zuñiga are all searching for her, for their various motives. The book's theme of the ubiquity of television (or the Tube) comes to a head when Hector, a Tube addict who has actually not been working with Brock, finds funding to create his pet project of a movie telling the story of the depraved sixties, with Frenesi Gates as the director, and the pomp and circumstance surrounding this big-money deal create a net of safety that allows Frenesi to come out of hiding. 24fps finds her and achieves their goal of allowing Prairie to meet her, at an enormous reunion of Frenesi's family. Weed Atman is also present at the reunion as one of many Thanatoids in the book—people who are in a state that is "like death, but different."

Brock, nearly omnipotent with D.E.A. funds, finds Prairie with a surveillance helicopter, and tries to snatch her up to get to Frenesi, but while he is hovering above her on a ladder, the government abruptly cuts all his funding due to a loss of interest in funding the war on drugs because people have begun playing along willingly with the antidrug ideal, and his helicopter pilot flies him away. Later he tries to come after Prairie and Frenesi again, but is killed when he crashes his helicopter. The family reunion allows everyone to tie up all their loose ends, and the book ends with Prairie looking into the beginning of a life no longer controlled by the fall-out of the past.

Technique 
Throughout the novel, Pynchon's technique is recognizable. From a cameo of Mucho Maas (from The Crying of Lot 49) to a bizarre episode hinting at Godzilla, Pynchon's "zaniness" pervades the novel. For example, Pynchon laces the book with Star Trek references. He has his characters watch a sitcom named Say, Jim, about a starship all of whose officers "were black except for the Communications Officer, a freckled white redhead named Lieutenant O'Hara." The numerous references to films rigorously include the year of release in a manner unusual for a work of fiction. Several characters are Thanatoids, victims of a particular karmic imbalance.

In addition, the novel is replete with female ninjas, astrologers, marijuana smokers, television addicts, musical interludes (including the theme song of The Smurfs) and metaphors drawn from Star Trek.

Critical reception
Vineland received mixed reviews. Author Tobias Meinel asserted in a 2013 essay that the novel "has led many critics to focus on its shift in style and content and to read it either as 'Pynchon Lite' or as a critical commentary on contemporary American culture." Salman Rushdie wrote a positive review in The New York Times following the book's 1990 release, praising it as "free-flowing and light and funny and maybe the most readily accessible piece of writing the old Invisible Man ever came up with." He called it "that rarest of birds" that, "at the end of the Greed Decade," is "a major political novel about what America has been doing to itself, to its children, all these many years." Although he praised Pynchon's light-yet-deadly touch at tackling the nightmares of the present rather than the past, Rushdie acknowledged that the book "either grabs you or it doesn't."

British literary critic Frank Kermode was disappointed by the book, feeling that it lacked the "beautiful ontological suspense" of The Crying of Lot 49 or the "extended fictive virtuosity" of Gravity's Rainbow. He did acknowledge that it was "recognisably from the same workshop" as Pynchon's previous outings but found it to be more incomprehensible. Brad Leithauser concurred, writing in The New Yorker that Vineland was "a loosely packed grab bag of a book" that recalled what was weakest about the author's canon and failed to extend or improve upon it. In the Chicago Tribune, James McManus posited that while inveterate Pynchon readers likely would unfavorably compare the book to Gravity's Rainbow, it was a manageable book with strong prose that succeeded as an arch and blackly amusing assault on the desires of Republican America.

Film critic Terrence Rafferty admired the novel, and in The New Yorker called it "the oldest story in the world—the original sin and the exile from Paradise," but author Sean Carswell later contended that aside from Rafferty and Rushdie, initial reviews of Vineland "run the gamut from slightly miffed to outright hostile." Edward Mendelson's review in The New Republic was mostly positive, however; although he found the plot to be tangled and tedious, he praised Pynchon's "intellectual and imaginative energy" and called the work "a visionary tale" whose world was "richer and more various than the world of almost any American novel in recent memory." He also commended the book's "comic extravagance," claiming that "no other American writer moves so smoothly and swiftly between the extremes of high and low style."

Mendelson additionally noted that Vineland was more integrated with its emotions and feelings than Pynchon's previous novels, and Jonathan Rosenbaum wrote in the Chicago Reader that it was the author's most hopeful work yet. That hopefulness was also mentioned by Rushdie, who believed that the book suggested community, individuality, and family as counterweights to the repressive Nixon-Reagan era, but Dan Geddes opined in 2005 in The Satirist that the book's "happy ending" was surprising, given its overarching warning about a growing police state. Contrarily, Rushdie found that the shocking final scene lent itself to a morally ambiguous ending, and he felt that the novel expertly held a balance between light and dark throughout its entire duration.

Notes

References
Ken Knabb (2002) Raptor, Rapist, Rapture: The Dark Joys of Social Control in Thomas Pynchon's Vineland
Patell, Cyrus R. K. (2001) Negative liberties: Morrison, Pynchon, and the problem of liberal ideology

Further reading
  Pynchon, Thomas R.  Vineland.  (Boston:  Little, Brown, 1990).
  Rushdie, Salman.  "Still Crazy After All Those Years", The New York Times January 14, 1990.
  Geddes, Dan. "Pynchon's Vineland: The War On Drugs and the Coming American Police-State", The Satirist
  Gordon, Andrew. "Smoking Dope with Thomas Pynchon: A Sixties Memoir".  The Vineland Papers:  Critical Takes on Pynchon's Novel, ed. Geoffrey Green, Donald J. Greiner, and Larry McCaffery (Normal, IL:  Dalkey Archive Press, 1994):  167–178.
  Thoreen, David. "The President's Emergency War Powers And The Erosion Of Civil Liberties In Pynchon's Vineland", Oklahoma City University Law Review 24, No. 3 (1999).
 John Diebold and Michael Goodwin: Babies of Wackiness, a "reader's guide to Vineland"

External links
Vineland Wiki
Vineland Cover Art Over Time @ ThomasPynchon.com

1990 novels
Novels by Thomas Pynchon
Fictional populated places in California
Novels set in California
Mendocino County, California
Postmodern novels
Fiction set in 1984